Jan Sargent is a British director and writer of television, film, and theatre. One of her best known productions is Arthur Miller's The Price at the Bristol Old Vic. She has also directed episodes of Where the Heart Is, Backup, Dangerfield, The Bill, Ruth Rendell Mysteries, Soldier Soldier, Casualty, Big Deal, Truckers, Black Silk, Desmonds, Births Marriages & Deaths and Small Change. She is married to actor George Irving.

References

External links 

Living people
British television directors
British theatre directors
Year of birth missing (living people)